Albert Russell Wynn (born September 10, 1951) is an American lobbyist and former politician who served as a member of the United States House of Representatives, representing the 4th district of Maryland from 1993 to 2008. On February 13, 2008, Wynn was defeated in the Democratic primary by Donna Edwards, and resigned his office effective May 31, 2008.

Early life and education
Wynn was born in Montgomery County, Pennsylvania. He was educated at the University of Pittsburgh, Howard University, and Georgetown University Law Center. While attending the University of Pittsburgh, Wynn was initiated as a member of the Beta Epsilon chapter of Kappa Alpha Psi fraternity.

Soon after graduating, Wynn became director of the Prince George's County Consumer Protection Commission. In 1982, he founded his own law firm. He then spent a decade in the Maryland General Assembly, serving in the state house from 1983 to 1987 and in the state senate from 1987 to 1993.

Career
Wynn entered the Democratic primary for the 4th District in 1992. The 4th had been reconfigured as a black-majority district after the 1990 Census, and the previous incumbent, three-term Democrat Tom McMillen, had been drawn out of the district. Wynn won a crowded seven-way primary by 1,300 votes, all but assuring him of election in the heavily Democratic district. He won the general election in November with 75 percent of the vote and was reelected seven times, never dropping below 75 percent of the vote.

Wynn was a member of the House Energy and Commerce Committee, where he chaired the Subcommittee on the Environment and Hazardous Materials. Wynn placed a high priority on economic issues. Wynn also supported the energy bill promoted by Vice President and former Halliburton CEO Dick Cheney.

During the 105th Congress, Wynn sponsored legislation passed to improve federal contracting opportunities for small and minority businesses. He has twice received the Small Business Administration Administrator's Leadership Award for his efforts on behalf of small businesses.

His 2000 re-election race made headlines, when the Congressman's estranged wife, Jessie Wynn, served as the campaign manager for his Republican opponent, John B. Kimble. In radio spots for Kimble's campaign, Mrs. Wynn stated "Albert Wynn does not respect black women. He left me for the white woman."

During the 107th Congress, Wynn was one of only four of 36 Congressional Black Caucus members who voted on October 10, 2002 for the joint resolution authorizing the Iraq War. The other three Congressional Black Caucus members who voted for the resolution authorizing the Iraq War were Bill Jefferson of Louisiana, Sanford Bishop of Georgia, and Harold Ford, Jr. of Tennessee.  Wynn also served on the Congressional Black Caucus' Political Action Committee and its Minority Business Task Force.

Wynn has issued statements of support for integrating illegal aliens into society, so long as strong border security provisions are included. He spoke at the Washington, D.C. Immigration Rally in April 2006, condemning H. R. 4437 and other bills that aim to deport all illegal immigrants. On Wynn's official website, he says "Now that they are in this country, we owe them respect and fair treatment."

2006 congressional elections

In 2006, he was challenged in the Democratic primary by community activist Donna Edwards, most recently executive director of the Arca Foundation. Edwards, who had clerked for Wynn in the 1980s while he served in the state legislature, criticized Wynn for his votes to support the Iraq war, repeal of the estate tax, support of the Bankruptcy Reform Act of 2005, and of the Bush Administration's energy bill, arguing that he was too conservative and too closely allied with Republicans. While Wynn was initially heavily favored, Edwards showed surprising strength. Two weeks before the primary, The Washington Post endorsed Edwards.

The primary was held on September 12, and when all the votes had been counted, Wynn defeated Edwards by 49.7 percent to 46.4 percent — by 2,725 votes out of more than 82,000 cast. George McDermott, a little-known candidate, took 3.9 percent. The final tally of the primary was unclear for nearly two weeks because of widespread voting problems on new electronic voting machines in Montgomery and Prince George’s counties.

2008 congressional elections

Edwards sought a rematch in 2008. This time, Edwards won the backing of the influential MoveOn.org. Edwards also had the support of many progressive community organizations, and many influential netroots organizations such as Daily Kos and OpenLeft.

In the primary, Edwards routed Wynn, 60 percent to 36 percent.

Resignation 

On March 27, 2008, Wynn announced his resignation from Congress effective in June.

Edwards was elected in a special election to finish out the rest of Wynn's term, defeating anti-war Republican primary winner Peter James in the general election in November 2008.

Post-congressional career

He became a partner of Dickstein Shapiro, a large lobbying firm whose clients include the tobacco, entertainment, energy, and software industries as well as the Teamsters. Because House rules prohibit former members from lobbying current members of Congress for one year after departing, Wynn began lobbying Congress in June 2009 instead of in January 2010 due to his early resignation.

Election history

!bgcolor=#CCCCCC |Year
!bgcolor=#CCCCCC |Office
!bgcolor=#CCCCCC |Election
!
!bgcolor=#CCCCCC |Subject
!bgcolor=#CCCCCC |Party
!bgcolor=#CCCCCC |Votes
!bgcolor=#CCCCCC |%
!
!bgcolor=#CCCCCC |Opponent
!bgcolor=#CCCCCC |Party
!bgcolor=#CCCCCC |Votes
!bgcolor=#CCCCCC |%
!
!bgcolor=#CCCCCC |Opponent
!bgcolor=#CCCCCC |Party
!bgcolor=#CCCCCC |Votes
!bgcolor=#CCCCCC |%
|-
|1992
|Congress, 4th district
|General
||
|bgcolor=#DDEEFF |Al Wynn
|bgcolor=#DDEEFF |Democratic
|bgcolor=#DDEEFF |136,902
|bgcolor=#DDEEFF |75.14
|
|bgcolor=#FFE8E8 |Michelle Dyson
|bgcolor=#FFE8E8 |Republican
|bgcolor=#FFE8E8 |45,166
|bgcolor=#FFE8E8 |24.79
|
|colspan=4|
|-
|1994
|Congress, 4th district
|General
||
|bgcolor=#DDEEFF |Al Wynn
|bgcolor=#DDEEFF |Democratic
|bgcolor=#DDEEFF |93,148
|bgcolor=#DDEEFF |75.03
|
|bgcolor=#FFE8E8 |Michelle Dyson
|bgcolor=#FFE8E8 |Republican
|bgcolor=#FFE8E8 |30,999
|bgcolor=#FFE8E8 |24.97
|
|colspan=4|
|-
|1996
|Congress, 4th district
|General
||
|bgcolor=#DDEEFF |Al Wynn
|bgcolor=#DDEEFF |Democratic
|bgcolor=#DDEEFF |142,094
|bgcolor=#DDEEFF |85.19
|
|bgcolor=#FFE8E8 |John B. Kimble
|bgcolor=#FFE8E8 |Republican
|bgcolor=#FFE8E8 |24,700
|bgcolor=#FFE8E8 |14.81
|
|colspan=4|
|-
|1998
|Congress, 4th district
|General
||
|bgcolor=#DDEEFF |Al Wynn
|bgcolor=#DDEEFF |Democratic
|bgcolor=#DDEEFF |129,139
|bgcolor=#DDEEFF |85.72
|
|bgcolor=#FFE8E8 |John B. Kimble
|bgcolor=#FFE8E8 |Republican
|bgcolor=#FFE8E8 |21,518
|bgcolor=#FFE8E8 |14.28
|
|colspan=4|
|-
|2000
|Congress, 4th district
|General
||
|bgcolor=#DDEEFF |Al Wynn
|bgcolor=#DDEEFF |Democratic
|bgcolor=#DDEEFF |172,624
|bgcolor=#DDEEFF |87.2
|
|bgcolor=#FFE8E8 |John B. Kimble
|bgcolor=#FFE8E8 |Republican
|bgcolor=#FFE8E8 |24,973
|bgcolor=#FFE8E8 |12.61
|
|colspan=4|
|-
|2002
|Congress, 4th district
|General
||
|bgcolor=#DDEEFF |Al Wynn
|bgcolor=#DDEEFF |Democratic
|bgcolor=#DDEEFF |131,644
|bgcolor=#DDEEFF |78.57
|
|bgcolor=#FFE8E8 |John B. Kimble
|bgcolor=#FFE8E8 |Republican
|bgcolor=#FFE8E8 |34,890
|bgcolor=#FFE8E8 |20.82
|
|colspan=4|
|-
|2004
|Congress, 4th district
|General
||
|bgcolor=#DDEEFF |Al Wynn
|bgcolor=#DDEEFF |Democratic
|bgcolor=#DDEEFF |196,809
|bgcolor=#DDEEFF |75.16
|
|bgcolor=#FFE8E8 |John McKinnis
|bgcolor=#FFE8E8 |Republican
|bgcolor=#FFE8E8 |52,907
|bgcolor=#FFE8E8 |20.2
|
|bgcolor=#9DFF9D |Theresa Dudley
|bgcolor=#9DFF9D |Green
|bgcolor=#9DFF9D |11,885
|bgcolor=#9DFF9D |4.54
|-
|2006
|Congress, 4th district
|General
||
|bgcolor=#DDEEFF |Al Wynn
|bgcolor=#DDEEFF |Democratic
|bgcolor=#DDEEFF |141,897
|bgcolor=#DDEEFF |80.67
|
|bgcolor=#FFE8E8 |Michael Moshe Starkman
|bgcolor=#FFE8E8 |Republican
|bgcolor=#FFE8E8 |32,792
|bgcolor=#FFE8E8 |18.64
|
|colspan=4|

See also
List of African-American United States representatives

References

External links
 
 

|-

1951 births
African-American members of the United States House of Representatives
Georgetown University Law Center alumni
Living people
Democratic Party Maryland state senators
Democratic Party members of the Maryland House of Delegates
Politicians from Philadelphia
University of Pittsburgh alumni
Howard University alumni
African-American state legislators in Maryland
Democratic Party members of the United States House of Representatives from Maryland
People from Mitchellville, Maryland
21st-century American politicians
The Graduate School of Political Management faculty
Baptists from Maryland
Members of Congress who became lobbyists